Sumaghiyyeh is a Palestinian dish native to Gaza City, prepared traditionally on holidays. It receives its name from the spice sumac.

The ground sumac is first soaked in water and then mixed with tahina (sesame seed paste), additional water, and flour for thickness. The mixture is then added to sautéed chopped chard, pieces of slow-stewed beef, and garbanzo beans. It is seasoned dill seeds, chili peppers and garlic fried in olive oil, then poured into bowls to cool. Pita bread is used to scoop it.

References

Arab cuisine
Palestinian cuisine
Palestinian inventions